Damn Yankees (retitled What Lola Wants in the United Kingdom) is a 1958 widescreen musical sports romantic comedy film. It was directed by George Abbott and Stanley Donen from a screenplay by Abbott, adapted from his and Douglass Wallop's book of the 1955 musical of the same name, itself based on the 1954 novel The Year the Yankees Lost the Pennant by Wallop. The storyline is a take on the Faust legend and centers on the New York Yankees and Washington Senators baseball teams. With the exception of Tab Hunter in the role of Joe Hardy (replacing Stephen Douglass), the Broadway principals reprise their stage roles, including Gwen Verdon as Lola.

A notable difference between the film and stage versions was Gwen Verdon's performance of the song "A Little Brains". Verdon's suggestive hip movements (as choreographed by Bob Fosse and performed on stage) were considered too risqué for a mainstream 1958 American audience, and so she simply pauses at these points in the film. The title was changed in the United Kingdom to avoid use of the word "Damn" on film posters, hoardings, and cinema marquees.

Plot
Joe Boyd (Robert Shafer) is a middle-aged fan of the unsuccessful Washington Senators baseball team. His obsession with baseball is driving a wedge between him and his wife, Meg—a problem shared by many other wives of Senators supporters. Meg leads them in lamenting their husbands' fixation with the sport ("Six Months Out of Every Year").

After seeing his team lose yet again, Joe rashly declares that he would sell his soul to the devil to see his team beat the Yankees.  No sooner has he spoken than the devil appears before him in the guise of a suave conman, Applegate.  Applegate claims he can go one better—he can restore Joe's youth, making him the player who wins them the pennant. Joe agrees, but persuades Applegate to give him an escape clause.  Applegate declares that Joe can back out, but only the day before the last game of the season—afterwards, his soul belongs to the devil.

Joe bids an emotional farewell to a sleeping Meg ("Goodbye Old Girl"), after which Applegate transforms him into a dashing young man, now called Joe Hardy.

The next day, the Senators' practice is a fiasco. Their manager, Ben Van Buren, gives the team a rousing pep talk ("Heart"). Applegate arrives and, introducing himself as a scout, presents his new discovery—Joe Hardy from Hannibal, Missouri. Joe promptly hits baseball after baseball out of the park in an impromptu batting practice. As he is signed to a Senators contract, female sportswriter Gloria Thorpe plans to quickly get Joe into the public eye ("Shoeless Joe from Hannibal, Mo.").

With tremendous home runs and game-saving catches, Joe leads the Senators on a long winning streak into pennant contention and becomes a national hero. Joe misses Meg dreadfully, however, and keeps sneaking back to his old neighborhood for a glimpse of her.  Realising this could ruin his plans, Applegate summons his demonic right-hand girl, Lola, a seductress who was once known as the ugliest woman in her territory, but sold her soul to Applegate in exchange for eternal youth and beauty. She is ordered to make Joe forget his wife, a task Lola is confident she can carry out ("A Little Brains, A Little Talent").

Joe succeeds in getting close to Meg by renting a room in his old house; Meg is unaware of his baseball stardom. Applegate and Lola corner Joe in the baseball team's locker room, where Lola confidently tries to seduce Joe ("Whatever Lola Wants"). But she has her first failure—Joe dearly loves Meg, and does not fall for Lola's tempting ways. Applegate angrily banishes Lola.

By the end of the season, the Senators are on the verge of overtaking the Yankees, so the Washington fans hold a lavish tribute ("Who's Got the Pain?"). Gloria, having returned from Hannibal, Missouri, where no residents remember a Joe Hardy, confronts Applegate about the player's true identity. Applegate implies that Joe is actually Shifty McCoy, a corrupt minor leaguer playing under a pseudonym. By the end of the tribute, newspapers arrive accusing Joe of being Shifty. He must meet with the baseball commissioner for a hearing or else be thrown out of baseball—on the day he plans to switch back to being Joe Boyd.

At the hearing, Meg and her female neighbors arrive as material witnesses, attesting to Joe's honesty and falsely claiming he grew up with them in Hannibal. The commissioner acquits Joe, but as everyone celebrates, midnight strikes and Joe realizes he is doomed.

Applegate has planned for the Senators to lose the pennant on the last day of the season, resulting in thousands of heart attacks, nervous breakdowns and suicides of Yankee-haters across the country. He is reminded of his other evil misdeeds throughout history ("Those Were the Good Old Days").

Following the hearing, Lola lets Joe know she's drugged Applegate so that he will sleep through the last game. They commiserate over their condemned situation at a nightclub ("Two Lost Souls").

Late the next afternoon, Applegate awakens to find the Senators/Yankees game well underway. Realizing Lola has tricked him—and worse, that Lola has actually fallen in love with Joe—he turns her back into an ugly hag.

They arrive at the ballpark by the ninth inning, the Senators up by a run. With two outs, one of the Yankee sluggers hits a long drive to the outfield. As he backs up to make the catch, Applegate impulsively switches Joe Hardy back into Joe Boyd in full view of the stadium. Now paunchy and middle-aged, Joe makes a final lunge at the ball and catches it. Washington wins the pennant! As his teammates celebrate and fans storm the field, an unrecognized Joe escapes from the ballpark.

Late that night, as the public wonders why Joe Hardy has disappeared, Joe Boyd meekly returns to his house. A tearful Meg hugs him and they sing to each other ("There's Something about an Empty Chair"). Applegate materializes once again and offers Joe the chance to resume being Joe Hardy in time for the World Series; he also makes Lola young and beautiful again to tempt Joe.  Joe ignores him, and a tantrum-throwing Applegate vanishes for good.

Cast

 Tab Hunter as Joe Hardy, a younger version of Joe Boyd
 Gwen Verdon as Lola, Applegate's demonic servant
 Ray Walston as Applegate, the Devil in disguise 
 Russ Brown as Benny Van Buren, the Washington Senators manager
 Shannon Bolin as Mrs. Meg Boyd, Joe Boyd's wife
 Robert Shafer as Mr. Joe Boyd, a fan of the Washington Senators
 Rae Allen as Gloria Thorpe, reporter
 Nathaniel Frey as Smokey, player
 James Komack as Rocky, player
 Albert Linville as Vernon, player
 Jean Stapleton as Sister Miller, Meg's friend
 Elizabeth Howell as Doris Miller, Meg's friend
 Bob Fosse as Mambo Dancer (uncredited)
 Harry Wilson as Spectator (uncredited) 
Uncredited in archive footage are Yogi Berra, Mickey Mantle, Bill Skowron, and other New York Yankees baseball players, plus Art Passarella (umpire)

Song list

"Overture" — Orchestra
"Six Months Out of Every Year" — Joe Boyd, Meg Boyd and chorus
"Goodbye Old Girl" — Joe Boyd/Joe Hardy
"Heart" — Van Buren, Smokey, Rocky
"Shoeless Joe from Hannibal, Mo" — Gloria
"There's Something About an Empty Chair" — Meg Boyd
"Whatever Lola Wants" — Orchestra
"A Little Brains, a Little Talent" — Lola
"Whatever Lola Wants" — Lola
"Those Were the Good Old Days" — Mr. Applegate
"Who's Got the Pain" — Lola and Mambo dancer (Bob Fosse)
"Two Lost Souls" — Lola and Joe Hardy
"There's Something About an Empty Chair (reprise)" — Joe Boyd and Meg Boyd

The "Overture" and "Two Lost Souls" are noticeably different from Broadway production in orchestration, and many of the lines in "Six Months Out of Every Year" were cut from the film. "A Little Brains, a Little Talent" has a few lyrical differences.

Some songs appear in different order than the original Broadway and subsequent versions, and some songs ("Near to You", "The Game", "A Man Doesn't Know", and "Heart (Reprise)") were cut entirely, which left Tab Hunter with very few songs. "There's Something About an Empty Chair" was not in the original stage version or in any stage versions since. While Bob Fosse is not credited for the Mambo number, Tab Hunter thanks him by name as they come off the stage.

Reception
Reviews from critics were generally positive. Bosley Crowther of The New York Times wrote that Verdon's performance was "one of the hottest and heartiest we've seen years ... Miss Verdon has the sort of fine, fresh talent that the screen badly needs these days. But lest she seem to be the whole show, let us hasten to proclaim that there's a great deal more to 'Damn Yankees' than this wonderful red-headed dame. Like the George Abbott stage show before it, it has class, imagination, verve and a good many of the same performers who did so charmingly by it on Broadway".

Variety wrote: "That 10 of the top 11 players, plus creators from writer to costume designer, have been transferred en masse from Broadway just about insures a film that is as least as good as its stage counterpart. What stands out like an inside-the-park home run is the skill and inventiveness with which the film is coated, thus making 'Damn Yankees' a funny picture",

Harrison's Reports called the film "a generally entertaining show even though it does not rate a rave notice. In treatment and presentation it is, for the most part, very much like a photographed stage play, in spite of the fact that the camera allowed for a wider range of activity".

Richard L. Coe of The Washington Post wrote of the play's transition to the screen, "It could be argued that perhaps it follows too closely, that this is too clearly a photographed stage musical. That I didn't mind in the least, because 'Damn Yankees' is a swell musical comedy and I'm a sucker for musical comedy".

John McCarten of The New Yorker found Walston and Verdon "just as delightful" on the screen as they were in the stage version, adding, "Although expository dialogue occasionally hobbles the proceedings, 'Damn Yankees' is for the most part commendably brisk, and the music and lyrics, by Richard Adler and Jerry Ross, are uniformly lively".

A somewhat mixed review in The Monthly Film Bulletin praised Verdon as bringing "great presence and a neatly sardonic humour" to the film while describing the score as "pleasant but unmemorable", and summarized the picture as "a musical made with a great deal of verve and some wit, but without much natural gaiety".

The film opened in Denver and after expanding became number two at the U.S. box office in the last week of September before moving to number one a week later during the World Series between the New York Yankees and the Milwaukee Braves.

Accolades

Other honors
The film is recognized by American Film Institute in these lists:
 2004: AFI's 100 Years...100 Songs:
 "Whatever Lola Wants" – Nominated
 2006: AFI's Greatest Movie Musicals – Nominated
 2008: AFI's 10 Top 10:
 Nominated Sports Film

Locations
Most of the baseball action was filmed at Los Angeles' Wrigley Field, a site often used in the 1950s for Hollywood films about baseball. The film contains footage of the famous left field wall of Griffith Stadium in Washington (home of the Senators)—and the house that protruded into the center field area—which gave author Douglas Wallop the plot device that allowed Joe Hardy to escape from the ballpark.

Remake
In 2009, Craig Zadan and Neil Meron attempted to produce a remake for New Line Cinema, with Jim Carrey as the Devil and Jake Gyllenhaal as Joe Boyd. Lola was never cast, and the project has been postponed indefinitely.

See also
 List of American films of 1958

References

External links

Damn Yankees lyrics at completealbumlyrics.com

1958 films
1958 musical comedy films
1958 romantic comedy films
1950s sports comedy films
American musical comedy films
American romantic musical films
American sports comedy films
The Devil in film
American baseball films
Films based on American novels
Films directed by Stanley Donen
Films directed by George Abbott
Films scored by Ray Heindorf
Films set in Washington, D.C.
Films about the New York Yankees
Films about rapid human age change
Warner Bros. films
Washington Senators (1901–1960)
Music based on the Faust legend
Films based on musicals
1950s English-language films
1950s American films